Alexander Peya and Bruno Soares were the defending champions, but decided not to participate.
Rohan Bopanna and Édouard Roger-Vasselin won the title, defeating Jamie Murray and John Peers in the final, 7–6(7–5), 6–4.

Seeds

Draw

Draw

References
 Main Draw

Rakuten Japan Open Tennis Championships - Doubles